Johol is a state constituency in Negeri Sembilan, Malaysia, that has been represented in the Negeri Sembilan State Legislative Assembly.

History

References

Negeri Sembilan state constituencies